Pestyaki is an urban-type settlement and the administrative center of Pestyakovsky District, Ivanovo Oblast, Russia. Population:

References

Notes

Sources

Urban-type settlements in Ivanovo Oblast
Gorokhovetsky Uyezd